TV 1 is a Sri Lankan general entertainment television channel which provides English and Sinhalese content aimed at the youth market. Founded in 1992 as MTV Newsvision, it was one of Sri Lanka's first privately owned television channels. Its sister channel MTV was renamed Sirasa TV in June 1998 and MTV Newsvision was renamed MTV. MTV was later re-branded Channel One MTV. On 26 January 2012 the channel was re-launched as MTV Sports. MTV Sports was re-branded MTV in July 2015. The channel was renamed TV 1 on the 21 January 2016.

The channel is available on UHF channel 58/59 in the Colombo area and on UHF channel 51 in the Kandy area. It is also available on PEO TV. TV 1 is owned by MTV Channel (Pvt) Ltd, part of the Capital Maharaja conglomerate.

Teledramas
 Balika Vadhu as Punchi Manali - පුංචි මනාලි 
 Kindurangana 
 Selfie
 Secret Garden (South Korean TV series) as Me Adambarakari

References

1992 establishments in Sri Lanka
English-language television stations in Sri Lanka
MTV Channel
Sinhala-language television stations
Television channels and stations established in 1992
Mass media in Colombo